Founded in 1964, the Victoria Conservatory of Music (VCM) is a music school in Victoria, British Columbia, Canada. The VCM has earned an outstanding reputation of quality in education, performance and music therapy.  As a music school for the whole community, the VCM welcomes students of all ages and musical abilities, and teaches in all musical genres including classical, contemporary and music technology.     Each year, over 4,500 students take part in an extensive array of disciplines including woodwinds, brass, percussion, keyboard, strings, voice, jazz, theory and composition, and programs such as music therapy, teacher training, early children’s music programs and Summer Music Academies.  In addition, the VCM offers a two-year performance-oriented post-secondary diploma program in partnership with Camosun College, credits from which are transferable to every major university in Canada. The VCM was once located at Craigdarroch Castle, and also spent time in a building on the grounds of St. Ann's Academy, but is now located at 900 Johnson Street, a building previously used as a church by the United Church of Canada. as well as a second beautiful location at 210 – 1314 Lakepoint Way, Langford. Cambodian musician Hy Chanthavouth studied at VCM.  Stephen Green is VCM's dean.

References

British Columbia music
Music schools in Canada
Schools in Victoria, British Columbia
1964 establishments in British Columbia
Educational institutions established in 1964